The Tŏksŏng Line is a non-electrified standard-gauge secondary line of the Korean State Railway in South Hamgyŏng Province, North Korea, running from Sinbukch'ŏng on the P'yŏngra Line to Sangri.

History 
On 20 September 1929 the Chosen Government Railway opened the Pukch'ŏng Line from Sinbukch'ŏng to Pukch'ŏng. In the 1940s an extension of the railway had been planned, but the construction was stopped because of the defeat of Japan in the Pacific War. The planned extension, from Pukch'ŏng to Sangri, was completed by the Korean State Railway and opened on 6 October 1960, and given its current name.

Services 

Two passenger trains are known to operate on this line:

 Regional trains 261/262, operating between Hamhŭng and Samgi, run on this line between Sinbukch'ŏng and Samgi;
 Local trains 866/867 operate on the entirety of this line between Sinbukch'ŏng and Sangri.

Route 
A yellow background in the "Distance" box indicates that section of the line is not electrified.

References

 Ministry of Railways (1937), 鉄道停車場一覧. 昭和12年10月1日現在(The List of the Stations), p501

Railway lines in North Korea
Standard gauge railways in North Korea